Harald Cerny (born 13 September 1973) is an Austrian former professional footballer who played as a right midfielder. He played mostly for TSV 1860 Munich.

Club career
After coming through the youth ranks at Admira Wacker, Cerny began his professional career at German club FC Bayern Munich in 1992–93, making his top division debut on 27 October 1992, in a 1–1 draw at Eintracht Frankfurt.

Just after the start of the 1993–94 season (he appeared in three matches for the eventual champions), Cerny returned to Admira, where a good league season prompted a move to FC Tirol. During 1995–96, he returned to Munich, but with neighbours TSV 1860 Munich. In his eleven-year spell, Cerny appeared in 213 first division contests (a club record) scoring 15 goals, while helping it consolidate in the top flight and appear in the UEFA Cup.

He retired after the 2006–07 season, having played with the Bavarians in the second division his final three campaigns.

International career
Cerny made his debut for Austria in a March 1993 friendly match against Greece. He earned 47 caps, scoring four goals.

His last international was an April 2004 friendly match against Luxembourg. He also played two matches at the 1998 FIFA World Cup in France, adding nine World Cup qualifiers.

Coaching career
After retiring, he got the job as head coach of the U-15 of TSV 1860 Munich and was named as replacement for Mehmet Scholl as head coach of the U-14 of FC Bayern Munich. After a short spell at U-17 coach of Hannover 96 Cerny is scouting for 1. FC Köln at the moment (2022).

Personal life
Cerny is married and has two children.

Career statistics

Scores and results list Austria's goal tally first, score column indicates score after each Cerny goal.

References

External links
 
 
 
 

1973 births
Living people
Austrian footballers
Footballers from Vienna
Association football midfielders
Austria international footballers
1998 FIFA World Cup players
Bundesliga players
2. Bundesliga players
Austrian Football Bundesliga players
FC Bayern Munich II players
FC Bayern Munich footballers
FC Bayern Munich non-playing staff
TSV 1860 Munich players
FC Admira Wacker Mödling players
FC Tirol Innsbruck players
Austrian expatriate footballers
Austrian expatriate sportspeople in Germany
Expatriate footballers in Germany
Association football coaches